The Cotton-Pickers is a 1926 novel by B. Traven.

Plot 

Gale is an itinerant who works jobs as a cotton picker, baker, cowboy, and oil rigger. He participates in a number of successive, spontaneous strikes without organized unions. He thinks of Guatemala and Argentina often.

Publication 

Vorwärts, the Social Democratic Party of Germany's newspaper, published a serialized version of The Cotton-Pickers as Die Baumwollpflücker between June 21 and July 2, 1925.  published a modified version as a full-length book, Der Wobbly (The Wobbly). Traven was influenced by the Wobblies (Industrial Workers of the World) in Mexico as he arrived in 1924.

Eleanor Brockett translated the book into English for Robert Hale in 1956.

References

Bibliography

External links 

 

1926 novels
German-language novels